The Assistant Secretary of State for Near Eastern Affairs is the head of the Bureau of Near Eastern Affairs within the United States Department of State. The Assistant Secretary guides the operation of the U.S. diplomatic establishment in various countries of North Africa and the Middle East and advises the Secretary of State and the Under Secretary of State for Political Affairs.

The Department of State established the position of Assistant Secretary of State for Near Eastern, South Asian, and African Affairs on October 3, 1949. The Commission on Organization of the Executive Branch of Government, popularly known as the Hoover Commission, had recommended that certain offices be upgraded to bureau level and after Congress increased the number of Assistant Secretaries of State from six to ten. The Department of State established a Division of Near Eastern Affairs in 1909, which dealt with Central, Southern, and Eastern Europe as well as with the Middle East. The final remnant of this practice ended on April 18, 1974, when the Department transferred responsibility for Greece, Turkey, and Cyprus to the Bureau of European Affairs.

The Division of Near Eastern Affairs included Egypt and Abyssinia (Ethiopia) from its inception, and acquired responsibility for the rest of Africa (except Algeria and the Union of South Africa) in 1937. Relations with African nations became the responsibility of a new Bureau of African Affairs on August 20, 1958, but relations with North African nations reverted to the Bureau of Near Eastern and South Asian Affairs on April 22, 1974. The Foreign Relations Authorization Act for Fiscal Years 1992 and 1993 authorized the appointment of an Assistant Secretary of State for South Asian Affairs on October 28, 1991. The Bureau of South Asian Affairs was established August 24, 1992, with the Bureau of Near Eastern Affairs arriving at its present title.

List of Assistant Secretaries of State for Near Eastern, South Asian, and African Affairs, 1949–1958

List of Assistant Secretaries of State for Near Eastern and South Asian Affairs, 1958–1992

List of Assistant Secretaries of State for Near Eastern Affairs, 1992–present
On August 24, 1992, the Bureau of Near Eastern and South Asian Affairs divided into a separate Bureau of Near Eastern Affairs and a Bureau of South and Central Asian Affairs. At that time, Edward Djerejian became Assistant Secretary of State for Near Eastern Affairs; he was also concurrently Acting Assistant Secretary of State for South and Central Asian Affairs until May 30, 1993.

References

 
 
United States–Middle Eastern relations
Arab–American relations
1949 establishments in the United States